Stora Lulevatten, "The Great Lule Water" is a lake in Norrbotten County, Lappland, Sweden.

References

Lapland (Sweden)
Lakes of Norrbotten County
Lule River basin